Ümit Yaşar Toprak also known by his nom de guerre Abu Yusuf Al-Turki (the "Turk") was a sniper in the al-Nusra Front who trained fighters on how to become snipers. He was also a member of the Wolf Unit, which was described as a unit of al-Nusra Front fighters (according to documents found by members of the Dubai-based Al Aan TV station). The Wolf Unit is reportedly another name for the Khorasan Group, though there are indications that the Khorasan Group may not exist as a separate entity from Jabhat al-Nusra. Of Turkish descent, Al-Turki lived in the Turkish province of Bursa, leaving behind five children so that he could fight for the al-Nusra Front. On 23 September 2014, Al-Turki was killed during a series of a U.S.-led anti-Khorasan Group coalition airstrikes over Syria.

References

1960s births
2014 deaths
Assassinated al-Nusra Front members
Deaths by American airstrikes during the Syrian civil war
Members of al-Qaeda in Iraq
Turkish al-Qaeda members